This is a list of curling clubs in Germany within the German Curling Association:

1. Sächsischer Curlingverein Geising – Geising
Eissport- und Schlittschuhclub 2007 Berlin e.V. – Berlin
Curling Club Hamburg – Hamburg
VERC Lauterbach – Schlitz
Curling Club Düsseldorf – Düsseldorf
Curling Club Wiehl – Gummersbach
Curling Club Unna – Schwerte
Curling Club Mannheim – Mannheim
Curlingclub Eintracht Frankfurt – Schaafheim
Baden Hills Golf & Curling Club – Rheinmünster
Curling Club Schwenningen – Villingen-Schwenningen
Curling Club Eiskristall Schwenningen – Villingen-Schwenningen
Curling Club Konstanz – Konstanz
Münchener Eislauf-Verein von 1883 e.V. – Munich
Sportclub Riessersee – Garmisch-Partenkirchen
Curling Club Mangfalltal – Bruckmühl
Eissport-Club Oberstdorf – Oberstdorf
Curling Club Füssen – Füssen
Thüringer Curling-Verein Erfurt – Erfurt
Curling Köln – Cologne

Germany
Clubs
Curling